Bing Crosby Live at the London Palladium  is a 1976 vinyl 2-LP live recording of the show put on by Bing Crosby, Rosemary Clooney, Kathryn Crosby and Ted Rogers at the London Palladium from June 21 to July 4, 1976. Musical support was provided by the Pete Moore Big Band and the Joe Bushkin Quartet. The Crosby children (Harry, Mary and Nathaniel) also took part.

The performances on June 25 and 26 were recorded by Ken Barnes and issued as a double album by K-Tel International under licence from United Artists Records. 

The album entered the UK charts in November 1977 and peaked at No. 9.

Most of the songs from the album were issued on CD for the first time in 1997 by EMI Records on a CD called “Bing Crosby 50th Anniversary Concert at the London Palladium” (catalogue No. 7243 8 57547 2 2). Omissions were the Crosby Family “Round” and tracks 15-17, 33-34 and 36.  An additional track – “Great Day” – was included and it is suspected that this came from the recording session for the At My Time of Life album.

The 3-CD set called “Bing Crosby – The Complete United Artists Sessions” issued by EMI Records (7243 59808 2 4) in 1997 included tracks 15-16, 33-34 and 36 but not track 17 and the Crosby Family “Round” neither of which have ever been issued in digital form.

Background
Bing Crosby had been tempted back into the recording studios by producer Ken Barnes and quickly made three albums with him in London. He also made two LPs which he financed himself and during an extended stay in the U.K. in the summer of 1975, he made many appearances on radio and television shows. His appetite for show business seemed to have returned and then he decided to give a series of concerts to celebrate his fifty years as an entertainer. Starting in California, and then coming across to the London Palladium for a two-week stint, his performances were a revelation to many and Crosby was clearly enjoying himself.

The opening of the show was clever, featuring as it did a British 1944 newsreel of Crosby singing at the opening of the Stage Door Canteen in London. The screen then lifted away, the orchestra played the opening bars of “Where the Blue of the Night,” and Crosby walked onto the stage to tumultuous applause. In unusually high temperatures, he was on stage at the Palladium for most of the two and a half hour show and he wound up with a thirty-five minute medley of his old hits, with the audience joining in enthusiastically, before closing with the song “That's What Life Is All About.”

The proceeds of the show went to the National Society for Cancer Relief, the Playing Fields Association, and the Duke of Edinburgh’s Award Scheme.

Personnel
No details for the Pete Moore Big Band.

Joe Bushkin Quartet
Joe Bushkin – piano
Johnny Smith – guitar
Jake Hanna – percussion
Lennie Bush – bass

Reception
Variety reviewed the show itself. "On opening night (21) the vet turned in a superlative performance and one perhaps not expected from a performer of his years. Though he looked frail, even tottery at times, the power and warmth of his voice is remarkably preserved, his charisma still intact, his wit still keen and his sense of showbiz paramount…Crosby was on stage — and on his feet, yet — for a good deal of the three hour initialer. He managed, moreover, to finish in a sprint noticeably stronger than his start. The Crosby show majors in sentimentality, but cleverly so, stopping short of goo, gush or schmaltz. He introduced his family who went through some musical romps while wife Kathryn showed a real talent for dancing. Crosby’s nostalgic repertory was spiked with a handful of new songs, indicating an awareness of what gives these days, though the crowd stood after his reprise in singalong style some 30 or so standards from the ‘20s, ‘30s and ‘40s… Show was well balanced, perfectly paced, expertly interlinked and a satisfyingly complete presentation."

Also Geoffrey Wansell writing for the prestigious newspaper The Times saw the show and commented: "The voice of the Old Groaner may not be quite as smooth now at 72. The range and register are only just there, but the pitch is still perfect and the tone and phrasing are magical. No one has ever missed a single word, or a single meaning, of a song that Crosby has sung. The “strolling player” as he calls himself, treated a rapturous audience to a cross section of some of his four-thousand songs he has recorded in fifty years or more of show business. Still looking more like a bank clerk than a star, he reminded them of the 300 million records he has sold in 27 languages and 88 countries in that time …"

Track listing
All tracks featuring Bing Crosby unless annotated.

SIDE ONE

SIDE TWO

SIDE THREE

Crosby Family “Round” (Bing Crosby and his family) (7:59)

SIDE THREE (continued)

SIDE FOUR

The Crosby Medley – Bing Crosby and the Joe Bushkin Quartet (30:18)

SIDE FOUR (continued)

References 

1976 live albums
Albums recorded at the London Palladium
Bing Crosby live albums
Albums produced by Ken Barnes (writer)
RCA Records live albums